This is a list of electoral results for the Electoral district of Kavel in South Australian state elections.

Members for Kavel

Election results

Elections in the 2020s

Elections in the 2010s

Elections in the 2000s

Elections in the 1990s

Elections in the 1980s

Elections in the 1970s 

The two candidate preferred vote was not counted between the Liberal and Liberal Movement candidates for Kavel.

References

SA elections archive: Antony Green ABC
2002 SA election: Antony Green ABC

South Australian state electoral results by district